This is a list of famous Vishnu temples present in Odisha.

Jagannath Temple - Puri
Neela Madhava Temple - Kantilo
Madhava Temple - Cuttack
Sakshigopal Temple - Sakshigopal
Khirachora Gopinatha Temple - Remuna
Ananta Vasudeva Temple - Bhubaneswar
Chhatia Bata - Chandikhol

Lists of tourist attractions in Odisha
Hindu temples in Odisha
Vishnu temples
Lists of Hindu temples in India